The following lists events that happened during 2000 in Zimbabwe.

Incumbents
 President: Robert Mugabe 
 First Vice President: Simon Muzenda
 Second Vice President: Joseph Msika

Events

September
Robert Mugabe, President of Zimbabwe is served with a civil suit, while visiting the United Nations. The suit states that he ordered killings, torture and terrorism in his country and is seeking $400 million in damages.

Mugabe still beholds power, in spite of presidential elections that were strongly suspected to be fraudulent. The pressure on journalists and most of all opposition members and their families got bigger since.

October
 Morgan Tsvangirai, politician, visits South Africa
 4 October - Armed police raid Capital Radio studios in Harare, confiscate equipment, dismantle aerials and search shareholders' homes.
 5 October - European Union imposes an arms embargo on Zimbabwe.
 6 October - Government gazettes new broadcasting regulations using Presidential Powers to ensure that 75 percent of all programming should have Zimbabwean content. Regulations exempt state-owned ZBC and ZTV.
 77 farms gazetted for compulsory acquisition.
 A Karoi court messenger is given a death threat after serving eviction notices on squatters and war veterans.
 Macheke farmer, Alan Don, is attacked by war veterans. He is hospitalized with head injuries, a gunshot wound in his leg, three broken teeth, extracted fingernails, ruptured eardrum and severe bruising.
 President Mugabe proclaims an amnesty for political prisoners. Clemency Order No 1 of 2000 grants a free pardon to every person liable to prosecution for politically motivated crimes committed between 1 January and 31 July 2000.
 9 October - Morgan Tsvangirai is questioned by police in Harare on his return from South Africa, about his involvement in treason and is released shortly afterwards.
 12 October - Noczim (National Oil Company of Zimbabwe) debt to suppliers rises to Z$11 billion.
 16 October - Karoi's Superintendent Mabunda is transferred to Harare after repeated accusations of biased policing.
 The war veteran accused of murdering opposition supporters in Kariba during the elections is released on the grounds of "insufficient evidence". The war veteran proceeds to a farm in Karoi, evicts the owners and moves into the homestead. The owner, Mr Slim Botha, dies of a heart attack days after being forced off his property.
 17 October - Bread riots break out in Harare after a 30 percent price rise is implemented.
 18 October - Bread riots spread to more suburbs in Harare.
 Armed police assault an opposition member of parliament and his family accusing them of inciting food riots.
 Army and police assault four South African journalists covering the food riots. Forced to lie on the ground, the four are beaten with batons and electric cables.
 19 October - A 14-year-old schoolboy is hospitalized with two bullets in his ankle after being shot by riot police in the aftermath of the bread riots.
 The Matabeleland Chamber of Industries states that 50 percent of its members face closure at the end of the year owing to the harsh economic climate. Analysts estimate 200,000 jobs will be lost.
 20 October - The Harare High Court order that ZANU-PF is not to disburse $30 million it obtained under the Political Parties Finance Act. The money should by law be given to the opposition.
 108 farms are gazetted for compulsory acquisition.
 A maize shortage is imminent as planting is down by 40 - 60 percent.
 22 October - Bindura farm manager, Keith McGaw, is severely assaulted by war veterans. Beaten with axes, pick handles and sticks, Mr McGaw has a fractured skull requiring 18 stitches and widespread bruising and lacerations.
 23 October - President Mugabe refers to white Zimbabweans as "cheats" and "crooks" in a BBC radio programme.
 On farms in Trelawny and Darwendale, convoys of government vehicles arrive and start distributing plots of land on unlisted properties. On one farm a convoy of 14 vehicles arrives, including army, air force and other government vehicles.
 24 October - Victims of political violence are forced to flee their homes after being harassed and threatened by their assailants, pardoned by President Mugabe.
 26 October - The opposition tables a motion in parliament to impeach President Mugabe.
 South African President Thabo Mbeki publicly condemns Zimbabwe's land grab for the first time.
 President Mugabe threatens to revoke the policy of reconciliation and prosecute whites for war crimes during the fight for Independence.
 30 October - Macheke farmer, Herman van Duren, is hospitalized with head wounds after being attacked and robbed by armed assailants.
 An air force helicopter circles tobacco seed beds on a farm in Norton to check that the owners had complied with their owner not to plant.
 97 prisoners have now been released under the Presidential Amnesty. 89 of the beneficiaries had already been convicted and were serving sentences in prison.
 31 October - Shamva farmer, Guy French, and five of his workers are attacked by war veterans with sticks and nail-studded clubs when they try to plant their ploughed field. Mr French is hospitalized with severe concussion, bruising and lacerations; his workers are admitted to Shamva Hospital.

November
 4,092 stockpiled anti-personnel mines are destroyed.
 1 November - Fuel prices increase for the second time in three months.
 Information Minister, Jonathan Moyo, calls for the removal of Chief Justice Anthony Gubbay.
 Karoi's Superintendent Mabunda returns to Karoi and visits all war veterans' bases on farms in the area. Increased violations are reported throughout the area that weekend including work stoppages, threats and a bull slaughtered. Farmers are laughed at by police in Karoi when they report incidences.
 6 November - University of Zimbabwe students hold a demonstration in support of striking lecturers. Riot police arrive and shoot tear-gas throughout the campus including in the hostels and UZ Clinic. Students are forced off the campus and the institution closes the following morning.
 A High Court Judge in Harare reserves judgement in the fraud case against Chenjerai Hunzvi. Hunzvi, accused of fabricating medical records, claimed a 118 percent disability from the War Victims' Compensation Fund.
 8 November - The continuing illegal movement of cattle from communal to commercial farms by war veterans leads to an outbreak of anthrax in Makoni North. Two people and 32 cattle die.
 9 November - Z$25 million worth of export beef is found rotten at the CSC factory in Gweru because of a faulty vacuum-packaging machine.
 10 November - The Supreme Court signs an Order by Consent declaring Fast-Track Resettlement unlawful. The commissioner of police is ordered to remove all squatters from farms that have been "fast-tracked".
 12 November - Municipal police in Mutare shoot and kill a 13-month-old baby whilst chasing unlicensed vendors at a bus stop.
 13 November - Mazoe farmer, Robin Marshall, in the presence of police, is attacked by war veterans and hospitalized with head injuries.
 14 November - War veterans begin rebuilding shacks on farms near Harare.
 17 November - President Mugabe's sister, Sabina, arrives at a farm in Norton in a Mercedes. She instructs 40 villagers to allocate land to themselves on a commercial farm that produces almost half of the country's seed maize.
 23 farms are gazetted for compulsory acquisition.
 Finance Minister Simba Makoni presents the 2001 budget to parliament. Income and corporate taxes are reduced as is duty on beer and bicycles.
 21 November - Anthrax spreads to Makonde where three pigs and 17 cattle die and six people are hospitalized after eating contaminated meat.
 Police fire live bullets at students protesting over catering at Hillside Teachers' Training College in Bulawayo.
 High Court Judge Chidyuasiku issues a Provisional Order preventing implementation of the Supreme Court Order to remove "fast-tracked" squatters.
 23 November - Leading pharmaceutical company, Johnson and Johnson, relocate their manufacturing division to South Africa owing to continuing economic instability.
 24 November - The Supreme Court overrules the High Court's Provisional Order saying it has no jurisdiction in the matter. The original Supreme Court Order stands.
 27 November - ZANU-PF wins the Marondera West by-election. The campaign was violent with numerous clashes and the death of one man. Out of 37,000 registered voters, only 12,000 go to the polls.
 Army and police are put on full alert to deter mass action threatened by the opposition.
 28 November - Nigeria's President Olusegun Obasanjo says that whilst he is willing to be a mediator in Zimbabwe's land crisis, the laws of the country must be followed.
 30 November - Minister of Information, Jonathan Moyo says government will not be removing squatters and war veterans from farms grabbed during "fast-track" resettlement. Minister Moyo says the Supreme Court Order is not a blanket eviction notice and that the government has not been acting unlawfully.
 Farmers in Bindura name three top government officials (two of whom are government ministers) involved in masterminding violence in the area.
 The CZI (Confederation of Zimbabwe Industries) announces that 23 percent of local manufacturing companies are to disinvest from Zimbabwe owing to economic decline.
 Telephone calls from Zimbabwe to Britain may be barred because the local PTC has failed to service its debt of Z$870 million to British Telecom.

December
 1 December - Bert Gardener, a Chinhoyi farmer in his mid-seventies is attacked in bed where his assailants attempt to strangle and suffocate him.
 5 December - The state withdraws all charges against the war veteran suspected of murdering Macheke farmer David Stevens. According to the public prosecutor, charges are withdrawn owing to "lack of evidence".
 6 December - A Nyabira farmer is abducted by war veterans and forced to drive to State House for an audience with President Mugabe. Guards at State House refuse the war veterans entry and police are called in to defuse the situation.
 8 December - The Electoral Modification Act is promulgated. This Act nullifies all electoral petitions filed by the Movement for Democratic Change challenging the result of the June election in 40 constituencies.
 11 December - Ndabaningi Sithole, born in 1920 in Nyamandhlovu, dies aged 80. Sithole, a veteran nationalist, was the founder and president of ZANU with Robert Mugabe as secretary general.
 12 December - Henry Elsworth aged 70, a former MP in both the Smith and Mugabe governments, is shot dead in an ambush on his farm. Mr Elsworth's son, Ian, is shot five times in the same incident and rushed to hospital.
 14 December - High Court Judges confirm that they have been informed that war veterans intend to attack them in their homes. The Police Protection Unit says they are on full alert.
 A Karoi farmer is attacked by 40 war veterans and receives severe bruising.
 The MDC files an urgent application with the Supreme Court challenging the Electoral Modification Act.
 15 December - Addressing delegates to the annual ZANU-PF congress, President Mugabe accuses whites of destroying the economy. He says, "Our party must continue to strike fear in the heart of the white man. They must tremble ...".
 The anthrax outbreak in Makonde spreads. Thirteen people are hospitalized and 21 cattle have died.
 The French Ambassador to Zimbabwe announces that France will not fund Zimbabwe's land reform programme as it is not being done within the law.
 16 December - Police in Harare shoot and kill a woman vegetable vendor whilst chasing a bus driver.
 A policeman is stabbed and killed by people angered at the shooting of a vegetable vendor. Riot police use tear-gas to control mobs that stone and burn police vehicles.
 18 December - Chenjerai Hunzvi threatens to "deal with" police whom he accuses of not supporting land resettlement.
 A farmer in Bulawayo receives a written death threat from war veterans. The letter refers to the murder in April of farmer Martin Olds and reads: "Your friend Martin was our breakfast for Christmas".
 19 December - 50 people are injured in political violence in Bikita ahead of parliamentary by-elections to be held in three weeks' time.
 Anthrax spreads to Mashonaland East. Five cattle die in Chiota.
 20 December - President Mugabe is heckled and booed in parliament as he makes his annual State of the Nation address.
 21 December - The United Nations Development Programme administrator, Mark Mallock Brown, submits his report on land reform to the government. The UN restates its position that the government should drop the "fast-track" resettlement programme.
 The Supreme Court declares that the rule of law has been persistently violated in the commercial farming areas and that the people in those areas have suffered discrimination in contravention of the constitution. The Court further states that the people in those areas have been denied the protection of the law and had their rights of assembly and association infringed. The Court orders the minister of Home Affairs and the commissioner of police to restore the rule of law in commercial farming areas by no later than July 1, 2001.

Deaths

March 
26 March 2000 Edwin Gomo. (MDC) Bindura.
26 March 2000 Robert Musoni. Mazowe West.

April 
2 April 2000 Doreen Marufu. (MDC) Mazowe.
4 April 2000 Tinashe Chakwenya. (Z.R. Police constable) Marondera.
14 April 2000 Tichaona Chiminya. (MDC) Buhera North.
15 April 2000. David Stevens. (MDC) Commercial Farmer. Murehwa.
15 April 2000. Talent Mabika. (MDC) Buhera North.
18 April 2000. Martin Olds. (MDC) Commercial Farmer. Bubi-Umguza.
20 April 2000 Julius Andoche. Farm Foreman. Murehwa South.
23 April 2000 Peter Kareza. (MDC) Shamva.
24 April 2000. Mr. Banda. (MDC) Shamva.
25 April 2000 Nicholas Chaitama. (MDC) Kariba.
25 April 2000. Luckson Kanyurira. (MDC) Kariba.
30 April 2000. Matthew Pfebve. (MDC) Mount Darwin.

May 
 6 May 2000. Tapera. Macheke.
 7 May 2000. Laben Chiwara. Harare.
 7 May 2000. Allan Dunn. Commercial Farmer. Seke.
 13 May 2000. Alex Chisasa. (Z. R. Police) Chipinge South.
 14 May 2000. John Weeks. Commercial Farmer. Seke.
 16 May 2000. Takundwa Chipunza. (MDC) Budiriro, Harare.
 17 May 2000. Joseph Mandeya. (MDC) Mutasa.
 17 May 2000. Mationa Mushaya. (United Party) Mutoko.
 17 May 2000. Onias Mushaya. (United Party) Mutoko.
 27 May 2000. Kufandaedza Musekiwa. Marondera West.
 29 May 2000. Thadeus Rukini. (MDC) Masvingo.
 31 May 2000. Tony Oates. Commercial Farmer. Zvimba North.

June 
 10 June 2000. Leo Jeke. Masvingo.
 10 June 2000. Fainos Zhou. (MDC) Mberengwa.
 11 June 2000. Mr. Chinyere. (MDC)
 19 June 2000. Constantine Mafemeruke. Kariba.
 19 June 2000. Patrick Nabanyama. (MDC) Bulawayo. Abducted, presumed dead.
 20 June 2000. Zeke Chigagura. (MDC) Gokwe East.
 20 June 2000. Tichaona Tadyanemhandu. (MDC) Hurungwe.
 23 June 2000. Wonder Manhango. (MDC) Gokwe North.
 27 June 2000. Matyatya. (MDC) Gweru.
 29 June 2000. Mandishona Mutyanda. (MDC) Kwekwe.
 June 2000. Nhamo Gwase. (MDC) Murehwa South.

July 
 23 July 2000. Willem Botha. Commercial Farmer. Seke.
 27 July 2000. Itayi Maguwu. (MDC) Harare.

August 
 9 August  2000. Samson Mbewe. Farm Worker. Goromonzi.

September 
 14 September 2000. Obert Guvi. Hurungwe West.

November 
 19 November 2000. Lemani Chapurunga. Marondera West.
 19 November 2000. Rimon Size. Marondera West.

December 
 12 December 2000. Henry Elsworth. (Commercial Farmer) Kwekwe.
 13 December 2000. Howard Kareza. (MDC) Shamva.
 31 December 2000. Bernard Gara (Zanu PF) Bikita West, Masvingo.

References 

 
Zimbabwe
2000s in Zimbabwe
Years of the 20th century in Zimbabwe
Zimbabwe